Edward Alexander Warner Jr. (born November 11, 1942) was a  Democratic member of the North Carolina House of Representatives representing the 45th district, including constituents in Cumberland County. A retired educator from Hope Mills, North Carolina, Warner served his ninth and last term in the 2003-2004 session before losing in the Democratic primary to Democratic Representative Rick Glazier.  Following his defeat in the Democratic Primary, Warner changed his party affiliation to Republican. He was born in Fayetteville.

Recent electoral history

2006

2004

2002

2000

References

External links

|-

|-

Living people
1942 births
People from Fayetteville, North Carolina
People from Hope Mills, North Carolina
Campbell University alumni
East Carolina University alumni
21st-century American politicians
Members of the North Carolina House of Representatives
North Carolina Democrats
North Carolina Republicans